Čule is a populated settlement in the Mostar municipality, Herzegovina-Neretva Canton, Federation of Bosnia and Herzegovina, Bosnia and Herzegovina. It is situated southwest of the city of Mostar along the R424 road.

Landmarks

The village contains the bagel shop Pekara Čula and the Svadbeni salon Luna, a venue that is used for weddings. The Catholic church of 
Crkva svetog Ilije proroka lies to the west in Selište.

Demographics
According to the 2013 census, its population was 387, all Croats.

References

Populated places in Mostar
Villages in the Federation of Bosnia and Herzegovina